Shane Stannett (born 24 June 1966) is a New Zealand wrestler. He competed in the men's freestyle 52 kg at the 1992 Summer Olympics.

References

1966 births
Living people
New Zealand male sport wrestlers
Olympic wrestlers of New Zealand
Wrestlers at the 1992 Summer Olympics
People from Te Awamutu
Sportspeople from Waikato